Solos for a German Flute a Hoboy or Violin with a Thorough Bass for the Harpsichord or Bass Violin Compos'd by Mr. Handel was published by John Walsh in 1732. It contains a set of twelve sonatas, for various instruments, composed by George Frideric Handel. The 63 page publication includes the sonatas that are generally known as Handel's Opus 1 (three extra "Opus 1" sonatas were added in a later edition by Chrysander).

The 1732 edition (which displays at the bottom of the title page the legend "Note: This is more Corect  than the former Edition") was mostly reprinted from the plates of an earlier 1730 publication, titled Sonates pour un Traversiere un Violon ou Hautbois Con Basso Continuo Composées par G. F. Handel—purportedly printed in Amsterdam by Jeanne Roger, but now shown to have been a forgery by Walsh (dated well after Jeanne Roger's death in 1722). There was also a third edition of a later, uncertain date, which bears the plate no. 407.

Each sonata displays the melody and bass lines—with the expectation that a competent keyboard player would supply the omitted inner parts based on the figured bass markings. By modern-day standards, the music in the publication has a primitive appearance—with squashed notes and irregular spacings, stems and bar widths—as can be seen in the image of page 1 (reproduced below in this article).

Despite the titles in both editions, four of the sonatas in each are for a fourth instrument: the flauto (recorder).

Summary
The following table lists each of the sonatas included by Walsh in his publication of 1732, as well as information about the instrument, the key, and the original sonata by Handel.

The following table lists the sonatas included by Walsh in his publication of 1730. Sonatas I – IX and XI were as per the 1732 publication (defined above).

See also
List of solo sonatas by George Frideric Handel
XV Handel solo sonatas (publication by Chrysander)
Handel flute sonatas

References

Bibliography
 Best, Terence. 1985. "Handel's Chamber Music: Sources, Chronology and Authenticity", Early Music 13, no. 4 (November): 476–99.
Hunter, David. 2002. "George Frideric Handel as Victim: Composer-Publisher Relations and the Discourse of Musicology". In Encomium Musicae: Essays in Memory of Robert J. Snow, edited by David E. Crawford and George Grayson Wagstaff, 663–92. Festschrift series, No. 17. Hillsdale: Pendragon Press. .
Hicks, Anthony. 2001. "Handel, George Frideric". The New Grove Dictionary of Music and Musicians, second edition, edited by Stanley Sadie and John Tyrrell. London: Macmillan Publishers.
 Kidson, Frank, William C. Smith, Peter Ward Jones, and David Hunter. 2001a. "Walsh, John (i)". The New Grove Dictionary of Music and Musicians, second edition, edited by Stanley Sadie and John Tyrrell. London: Macmillan Publishers.
 Kidson, Frank, William C. Smith, Peter Ward Jones, and David Hunter. 2001b. "Walsh, John (ii)". The New Grove Dictionary of Music and Musicians, second edition, edited by Stanley Sadie and John Tyrrell. London: Macmillan Publishers.
 Smith, William Charles, and Charles Humphries. 1968. A Bibliography of the Musical Works Published by the Firm of John Walsh During the Years 1721–1766. London: Bibliographical Society.

External links
Brown, Rachel. 2009. "Handel Flute and Recorder Sonatas" (Accessed 20 February 2010)
Sonates pour un Traversiere un Violon ou Hautbois (pseudo–Jeanne Roger edition). (Accessed 20 February 2010)
Handel – 19 Sonatas For Various Instruments (Chrysander) (Accessed 20 February 2010)
Handel – Sonatas (Walsh) (Accessed 20 February 2010)
Imslp aclaratory note on early editions

Sonatas by George Frideric Handel
1732 books
1732 compositions